The 2007 World Archery Championships was the 44th edition of the event. It was held in Leipzig, Germany on 7–15 July 2007 and was organized by International Archery Federation (FITA).

Medals table

Medals summary

Recurve

Compound

References

External links
 World Archery website
 Complete results

 
World Championship
World Archery
A
World Archery Championships
July 2007 sports events in Europe
Sports competitions in Leipzig
2000s in Saxony